Scipioni is an Italian surname. Notable people with the surname include:

Bruno Scipioni (1934–2019), Italian actor and voice actor
Jacopino Scipioni ( 1470–1532), Italian painter

Italian-language surnames